Nesër TV abbreviated as NTV, is a local private television station in Tirana,  Albania. NTV has been present in the field of television media since 1998, and received broadcasting rights in 2003. The station is a general information broadcaster that embraces the coverage of social, cultural and political issues in Albania. NTV has been characterized by a simplicity of language, respect for journalistic ethics, monitoring information sources, and constantly searching for the truth. This approach has placed NTV in a respected position in the media landscape.

Programs 
 Radiokroaci
 Stock Time
 Lajmi i parë ndryshe
 DW program i përditshëm
 Casting
 Euro Zone
 Pink
 Profil
 Reportazh
 Përtej lajmit
 Forum Sondazh
 8a8
 Memorie
 Busull
 Këndvështrim
 Informal
 Eja
 Corner
 Trafik
 Radio Taksi

See also
Television in Albania

Notes and references

Television networks in Albania
Mass media in Tirana